The Highlands and Islands is an area of Scotland broadly covering  the Scottish Highlands, plus Orkney, Shetland and Outer Hebrides (Western Isles).

The Highlands and Islands are sometimes defined as the area to which the Crofters' Act of 1886 applied. This area consisted of eight counties of Scotland:

 Argyll
 Caithness
 Inverness
 Nairn
 Orkney 
 Ross and Cromarty
 Shetland 
 Sutherland

Highlands and Islands Enterprise (HIE) uses a broader definition also used at Eurostat's NUTS level 2, and there has been a Highlands and Islands electoral region of the Scottish Parliament since 1999.

In Highlands and Islands Fire and Rescue Service the name refers to the local government areas (council areas) of Highland, Orkney, Shetland and the Western Isles. Northern, as in Northern Constabulary, is also used to refer to this area.

As of early 2021, Police Scotland operated six Command Areas in Highlands and Islands: North Highland, Inverness, South Highland, Orkney Islands, Shetland Island and Western Isles. Each had a Local Area Commander and a Chief Inspector. The police service works in partnership with Highland Council, Shetland, Orkney and Western Isles Councils.
 
The HITRANS (Highlands and Islands Partnership for Transport), established in 2006, covers most of the council areas of Argyll and Bute, Highland, Moray, Orkney and the Western Isles.  Shetland is covered by the separate Shetland Partnership for Transport. Helensburgh and Lomond is covered by SPT.

A 2018 estimate stated that population was 469,365, an increase of 0.5% from 2011. A higher than average percentage were self-employed compared to Scotland (11.0% compared to
8.7%). The unemployment rate was lower than in Scotland in general, 2.3% vs. 3.2%, and the employment rate was higher at 78.6% vs. 74.7%.

The restrictions required by the worldwide pandemic increased unemployment in the Highlands and Islands in summer 2020 to 5.7%; that was significantly higher than the 2.4 per cent in 2019. The rates were said to be highest in "Lochaber, Skye and Wester Ross and Argyll and the Islands". A December 2020 report stated that between March (just before the effects of pandemic were noted) and December, the unemployment rate increased by "more than 97%" and suggested that the outlook was even worse for spring 2021.

Politics
Highlands and Islands is an electoral region of the Scottish Parliament. In the 2007 election, this region was the last to declare its regional votes, which were the decisive results in determining that the Scottish National Party overtook Scottish Labour to obtain the largest representation in the Scottish Parliament by one seat.

In the June 2017 election, Angus MacNeil, Drew Hendry and Ian Blackford (all SNP) were re-elected in Highlands and Islands. One new MP was elected, Jamie Stone(Lib Dem).

See also
 Scottish Lowlands
 Central Belt

References 

Geography of Scotland
Regions of Scotland
Geography of Highland (council area)
Geography of Orkney
Geography of Shetland
Islands of Argyll and Bute
NUTS 2 statistical regions of the United Kingdom